James Allen Vann III (20 November 1939 – 4 May 1986) was an American historian, specializing in German history of the early modern period. He was a professor of History at Emory University.  Born in Birmingham, Alabama, he graduated from Washington and Lee University, where he graduated summa cum laude in 1961.  He served two years in the army, then entered Harvard University, where he received the Doctorate of Philosophy (Ph.D.) in 1970.  He joined the faculty of the University of Michigan that same year.  He served on the faculty of the École des Hautes Études en Sciences Sociales in Paris from 1983–84. Following his assignment there, he joined the faculty at Emory University in Atlanta.

His 1975 work, The Swabian Kreis: Institutional Growth in the Holy Roman Empire, 1648–1715, established Vann among a group of young scholars whose new vision of the historical Holy Roman Empire challenged classical notions of that institution's viability and functionality. In his study of Württemberg, he rejected traditional ideas of state building as a conscious social determinism, but instead explained the evolution of a German state in terms of relations between and among the dukes and the courtiers, privy councilors and the general representative body of the Landtag.

Since 1985, the James Allen Vann Seminar, continued in his honor, offers an informal venue for scholars, graduate students, and other interested parties from the Atlanta area to discuss scholarly papers on topics concerning pre-modern European history and the relations between early modern Europe and the rest of the world.

Principal publications
The Making of a State: Württemberg, 1593–1793. Ithaca : Cornell University Press, 1984. 
The Old Reich: Essays on German political institutions, 1495–1806.  Bruxelles : Editions de la librairie encyclopédique, 1974.  (as co-editor)
The Swabian Kreis: Institutional Growth in the Holy Roman Empire, 1648–1715. Bruxelles [r. du Luxembourg 40]: Editions de la librairie encyclopédique, 1975.

References

1939 births
1986 deaths
Washington and Lee University alumni
Harvard University alumni
Historians of Germany
20th-century American historians
American male non-fiction writers
University of Michigan faculty
20th-century American male writers